{{safesubst:#invoke:RfD|||month = March
|day = 20
|year = 2023
|time = 20:06
|timestamp = 20230320200658

|content=
REDIRECT El train

}}